Forward is an unincorporated community in the town of Perry, Dane County, Wisconsin, United States.

The area is named after the state motto of Wisconsin.

Notes

Unincorporated communities in Dane County, Wisconsin
Unincorporated communities in Wisconsin